Like almost all Southern states during the American Civil War, Arkansas provided a number of units to fight for the Union, organized from African-Americans and pro-Union sympathizers. Arkansas had the third smallest white population out of the Confederate states, but more whites joined the Union Army from that state than any other besides Tennessee. In addition, 5,526 African-Americans served in Union units raised in Arkansas. The list of Confederate units is shown separately.

See also 
Lists of American Civil War Regiments by State
Arkansas Civil War Confederate Units
Southern Unionists
United States Colored Troops

References

Bibliography 
 Dyer, Frederick H. (1959). A Compendium of the War of the Rebellion. New York and London. Thomas Yoseloff, Publisher. .
 Atkinson, J. H., ed. (1862). Clayton and Catterson Rob Columbia County. Arkansas Historical Quarterly 21 (Summer 1962): 153–158.
 Barnes, Kenneth C. (1998). Who Killed John Clayton? Political Violence and the Emergence of the New South, 1861–1893. Durham, NC: Duke University Press.
 Bears, Edwin C. (1990). Steele’s Retreat from Camden and the Battle of Jenkin’s Ferry. Little Rock: Eagle Press.
 Brothers in Arms: Civil War Exhibition. Old State House Museum Online Collections. Brothers in Arms Collection (accessed May 18, 2011).
 Buxton, Virginia. Clayton's Militia in Sevier and Howard Counties. Arkansas Historical Quarterly 20 (Winter 1961): 344–350.
 Christ, Mark K. Civil War Arkansas, 1863: The Battle for a State. Norman: University of Oklahoma Press, 2010.
 Clayton, Powell. The Aftermath of the Civil War in Arkansas. New York: Negro University Press, 1969.
 Dougan, Michael B. Confederate Arkansas: The People and Politics of a Frontier State in Wartime. Tuscaloosa: University of Alabama Press, 1976.
 Finley, Randy. From Slavery to Uncertain Freedom: The Freedmen's Bureau in Arkansas, 1865–1869. Fayetteville: University of Arkansas Press, 1996.
 Pearce, Larry Wesley. The American Missionary Association and the Freedmen in Arkansas, 1863–1878. Arkansas Historical Quarterly 30 (Summer 1971): 123–144.
 Pearce, Larry Wesley. The American Missionary Association and the Freedmen's Bureau in Arkansas, 1866–1868. Arkansas Historical Quarterly 30 (Autumn 1971): 242–259.
 Pearce, Larry Wesley. The American Missionary Association and the Freedmen's Bureau in Arkansas, 1868-1878. Arkansas Historical Quarterly 31 (Autumn 1972): 246–261.
 Richards, Ira D. The Battle of Poison Spring. Arkansas Historical Quarterly 18 (Winter 1959): 338–349.
 Unknown. The Camden Expedition, March 23–May 3, 1864. MA thesis, University of Arkansas, 1958.
 Singletary, Otis. Negro Militia and Reconstruction. Austin: University of Texas Press, 1957.
 Staples, Thomas. Reconstruction in Arkansas, 1862–1874. New York: Columbia University Press, 1923.
 Steele, Phillip, and Steve Cottrell. Civil War in the Ozarks. Gretna, LA: Pelican Press, 1993.
 Stith, Matthew W. Social War: People, Nature, and Irregular Warfare on the Trans-Mississippi Frontier, 1861–1865. PhD diss., University of Arkansas, 2010.
 Taylor, Orville. Negro Slavery in Arkansas. Fayetteville: University of Arkansas Press, 2000.
 Thompson, George H. Arkansas and Reconstruction: The Influence of Geography, Economics, and Personality. Port Washington, NY: Kennikat Press, 1976.
 Trelease, Allen W. White Terror: The Ku Klux Klan Conspiracy and Southern Reconstruction. Baton Rouge: Louisiana State University Press, 1971.
 Worley, Ted R. The Arkansas Peace Society of 1861: A Study in Mountain Unionism. The Journal of Southern History 24 (November 1958): 445–456.

 
Arkansas
Civil War Union units